PNB Housing Finance Limited (PNB Housing) is a registered housing finance company with National Housing Bank (NHB). It was incorporated under the Companies Act, 1956 and commenced its operations on 11 November 1988. PNB Housing is promoted by Punjab National Bank (PNB). The Company came out with a public issue of equity shares in November 2016. Its equity shares are listed on National Stock Exchange (NSE) and Bombay Stock Exchange (BSE) with effect from 7 November 2016. The company provides housing loans & loan against property as a part of its product portfolio and also holds the license to accept public deposits.

As on 31 December 2018, the shareholding pattern in PNB HFL, Highest shareholding is 32.7 percent of PNB BANK (PROMOTER/Parent) & 32.3 Percent of Quality investment holding (QIH) & remaining part of FII, public, mutual fund companies, corporate bodies & others.

Company history

PNB Housing Finance was incorporated under the Companies Act, 1956 and commenced its operations on 11 November 1988 as a wholly owned subsidiary of Punjab National Bank (PNB). On 9 December 2009 PNB entered into a strategic partnership with Destimoney Enterprises Private Limited (DEPL) and sold its 26% stake to DEPL. DEPL which held 49% shares in the company until February 2015 sold its entire shareholding to Quality Investments Holdings, which is owned by Carlyle Group, a global investment firm. The remaining 51% was owned by the parent bank i.e. Punjab National Bank.

In November 2016, the Company came out with a public issue of equity shares. Its equity shares are listed on National Stock Exchange (NSE) and Bombay Stock Exchange (BSE) with effect from 7 November 2016. Post the public issue, the promoters jointly hold 76% of shared in the company and the public shareholding stands at 24%. The Company does have a 100% owned subsidiary for offering various loans under a dedicated direct sales force.

Operations

The company has Pan India presence in more than 60 locations through a network of 84 branches & 36 outreach offices as on 31 March 2018. Company’s 22 hubs are located at New Delhi, Bengaluru, Chandigarh, Chennai, Noida, Jaipur, Dehradun, Lucknow, Kolkata, Trivandrum , Cochin, Coimbatore, Mumbai, Thane, Pune, Ahmedabad, Indore and Hyderabad which support branch operations
The company provides doorstep service for its products via Direct Sales Team (DST) channel.
Other than the DST channel, company’s Home Loan and Loan against Property business is also sourced via Direct Marketing Associates (DMA) and Digital Medium.
Fixed Deposits, other than direct channel is also sourced via Broker Network

ProductsHome Loan: PNB Housing provides housing loans to individuals for construction, purchase, repair, and upgrade of houses. Non Home Loan: The company also provides loan against property, commercial property loan, lease rental discounting loans for commercial property, loans for purchase of residential plots and loan for real estate developersDeposits:''' PNB HFL also offers Fixed Deposits of different maturities and various interest payment options

Citations and references

Housing finance companies of India